Eritrea competed at the 2022 Winter Olympics in Beijing, China. The 2022 Winter Olympics were held from 4 to 20 February 2022.

Eritrea's team consisted of one male alpine skier. Alpine skier Shannon-Ogbnai Abeda as the only athlete from the country, carried the country's flag during the opening and closing ceremonies.

Competitors
The following is the list of number of competitors at the Games per sport/discipline.

Alpine skiing

By meeting the basic qualification standards, Eritrea qualified male alpine skier, Shannon-Ogbnai Abeda. Abeda competed in one event, the men's giant slalom, where he had a combined two run total for a time of 2:40.45, placing him 39th overall out of 87 skiers. This improved his result by 22 spots from 2018.

See also
Tropical nations at the Winter Olympics

References

External links
Beijing 2022 – Eritrea

Nations at the 2022 Winter Olympics
2022
Winter Olympics